The 2016–17 FIU Panthers men's basketball team represented Florida International University during the 2016–17 NCAA Division I men's basketball season. The Panthers, led by fourth-year head coach Anthony Evans, played their home games at FIU Arena in Miami, Florida and were members of Conference USA. They finished the season 7–24, 3–15 in C-USA play to finish in 13th place. They failed to qualify for the C-USA tournament.

Previous season 
The Panthers finished the 2015–16 season 13–19, 7–11 in C-USA play to finish in a three-way tie for ninth place. They lost in the second round of the C-USA tournament to UTEP.

Offseason

Departures

Incoming transfers

Recruiting class of 2016

Preseason 
The Panthers were picked to finish in 11th place in the preseason Conference USA poll.

Roster

Schedule and results

|-
!colspan=9 style=| Non-conference regular season

|-
!colspan=12 style=| Conference USA regular season

References

FIU Panthers men's basketball seasons
Florida International
FIU Panthers men's b
FIU Panthers men's b